Radium Springs is a census-designated place (CDP) in Doña Ana County, New Mexico, United States. The population was 1,699 at the 2010 census. It is part of the Las Cruces Metropolitan Statistical Area.

Geography

Radium Springs is at the upstream end of the Mesilla Valley of the Rio Grande. According to the United States Census Bureau, the CDP has a total area of 6.0 square miles (19.6 km), all land. It is also the location of an old hot springs and the old Fort Selden of the Indian Wars.

Demographics

As of the census of 2010, there were 1,699 people living in the CDP. The population density was 283 people per square mile (109/km). There were 689 housing units at an average density of 115 per square mile (44/km). The racial makeup of the CDP was 85.5% White, 0.5% African American, 0.9% Native American, 0.4% Asian, 10.9% from other races, and 1.7% from two or more races. Hispanic or Latino of any race were 52.8% of the population.

There were 635 households, out of which 32.0% had children under the age of 18 living with them, 57.3% were married couples living together, 12.0% had a female householder with no husband present, and 24.6% were non-families. 19.5% of all households were made up of individuals, and 5.7% had someone living alone who was 65 years of age or older. The average household size was 2.68, and the average family size was 3.06.

In the CDP, the population's age was spread out, with 22.4% under the age of 15, 10.6% from 15 to 24, 21.99% from 25 to 44, 32.4% from 45 to 64, and 12.9% who were 65 years of age or older. The median age was 41 years. For every 100 females, there were 94.8 males. For every 100 females age 16 and over, there were 94.5 males.

The median income for a household in the CDP was $53,188, and the median income for a family was $66,250. Male full-time workers had a median income of $36,753, versus $30,829 for females. The per capita income for the CDP was $20,497.

Education
It is located in Las Cruces Public Schools.

References

Census-designated places in Doña Ana County, New Mexico
Census-designated places in New Mexico
New Mexico populated places on the Rio Grande